Astrid Mio Maria Hasselborg (born 19 December 1980) is a Swedish female curler.

She is a two-time .

Hasselborg was born in a family of well-known Swedish curlers; her father Stefan, uncle (Stefan's brother) Mikael, and cousins (Mikael's children) Marcus (son) and Anna (daughter).

Teams

References

External links
 

Living people
1980 births
Swedish female curlers
European curling champions
Swedish curling champions
21st-century Swedish women